In the 2011 Cricket World Cup, the knockout stage was the second and final stage of the World Cup, following the group stage. The top four teams from each group (8 total) advanced to the knockout stage to compete in a single-elimination style tournament. A third place playoff match is not included in the tournament. The one-over eliminator was introduced into One Day International cricket at the 2011 Cricket World Cup knockout stage where a game ending in a tie would be decided via a one-over eliminator.
With their victory over Zimbabwe, Sri Lanka became the first team to qualify for the Quarter-finals of the tournament.

Tournament bracket

Matches

Quarter-finals

West Indies v Pakistan

West Indies won the toss and elected to bat first. They lost early wickets and never recovered, being completely bowled out for a paltry 112. Pakistan got there without losing a wicket. This was the West Indies' lowest score in the knockout stages. and the third lowest in their World Cup history. With this win, Pakistan has reached at least the Semi Final stages in five consecutive ICC tournaments, including one ICC Champions Trophy and three ICC World Twenty20.

Australia v India

Australia's loss to India ended their 12-year reign as ODI world champions. Australia posted 260 for 6 wickets at the end of their innings with Ricky Ponting scoring 104 runs. In response, India chased down the target with 14 balls to spare. India's innings was built on half-centuries by Sachin Tendulkar, Gautam Gambhir and Yuvraj Singh, as well as an unbroken partnership of 74 between Yuvraj and Suresh Raina.

New Zealand v South Africa

This was the sixth time New Zealand had qualified for the semi-final, equalling Australia's and Pakistan's record.

England v Sri Lanka

Tillakaratne Dilshan and Upul Tharanga both made centuries as Sri Lanka chased down a target of 230 to win by ten wickets; this run chase set a new record for the highest successful run chase in a ten-wicket victory in ODI history.

Semi-finals

New Zealand v Sri Lanka

For a second consecutive time Sri Lanka defeated New Zealand in the semi-finals of the World Cup and made it to the finals. This was the last match Muttiah Muralidaran played on Sri Lankan soil.

India v Pakistan

The match was attended by the Prime Ministers of both the countries, Yousaf Raza Gillani of Pakistan and Manmohan Singh of India. Anti-aircraft missiles were deployed at Mohali to prevent any air attacks. The local airport was full of private jets, and an estimated one billion people saw the match on television. Tickets for the match were selling for over ten times their normal selling price on the black market.

India won the toss and elected to bat first. Sachin Tendulkar was dropped four times and survived an early leg before wicket decision before being dismissed for 85. India finished with a total of 260. Pakistan had a steady start, but India kept taking wickets and won by 29 runs.

After the match was over Indian and Pakistani leaders pledged to resolve their differences, including cooperation in the investigation of the 2008 Mumbai attacks. Additionally the skies over Delhi were lit up with large numbers of fireworks.

Final

This was Sri Lanka's second consecutive loss in a World Cup Final and was also Muttiah Muralidaran's last ODI match. This match also recorded the highest successful run chase by any team in a World Cup Final and also only the third time that a team batting second had won the World Cup Final. This was also the first time that a host nation in their own country won the World Cup.

References

External links
2011 World Cup website

Knockout stage